Joanne B. Huelsman (born March 21, 1938) is a former member of the Wisconsin State Assembly and the Wisconsin State Senate.

Born in Harvey, Illinois, Huelsman received her bachelor's degree from University of Wisconsin–Madison and her law degree from Marquette University Law School. Huelsman practiced law, was in the real estate business, and owned a small business. She served on the Waukesha, Wisconsin Board of Education and the Waukesha County Board of Supervisors. Huelsman was elected to the Senate in 1990 and was re-elected in 1994 and 1998. Previously, she was elected to the Assembly in 1988. She is a Republican.

References

People from Harvey, Illinois
Politicians from Waukesha, Wisconsin
University of Wisconsin–Madison alumni
Marquette University Law School alumni
Wisconsin lawyers
Businesspeople from Wisconsin
County supervisors in Wisconsin
School board members in Wisconsin
Republican Party Wisconsin state senators
Women state legislators in Wisconsin
1938 births
Living people
21st-century American women
Republican Party members of the Wisconsin State Assembly